Allineuc (Gallo: Aleinoec) is a commune in the Côtes-d'Armor department of Brittany in north-western France.

Population

Inhabitants of Allineuc are called Allineucois in French.

See also
Communes of the Côtes-d'Armor department

References

External links

Communes of Côtes-d'Armor